A constitutional referendum was held in Zimbabwe on 12–13 February 2000. The proposed new Constitution of Zimbabwe, which had been drafted by a Constitutional Convention the previous year, was defeated. The defeat was unexpected and was taken as a personal rebuff for President Robert Mugabe and a political triumph for the newly formed opposition group, the Movement for Democratic Change. The new proposed constitution was notable for giving power to the government to seize farms owned by white farmers, without compensation, and transfer them to black farm owners as part of a scheme of land reform.

The referendum was characterized by political violence.

Background

The constitution of Zimbabwe had been drawn up as part of the Lancaster House Agreement of 1979 and had served the country for nearly 20 years. There was a widespread feeling in Zimbabwe that it was too heavily influenced by the country's colonial past, and that a new constitution written in the light of the experience of independence was desirable. Accordingly, on 21 May 1999, President Mugabe announced the convening of a Constitutional Convention to draft such a constitution fit for the country. The chairman of the commission was a senior judge, Godfrey Chidyausiku. 396 people were named to the convention, including all 150 members of the House of Assembly; some previous opponents of the government were included among the 246 other members, such as Professor Jonathan Moyo.

Over August and September the Convention held more than 5,000 meetings with local people and groups in Zimbabwe, with many seeing concerns voiced over granting of more powers to the executive Presidency. There had already arisen a community group called the National Constitutional Assembly (formed 1997) which convened a "People's Constitutional Convention" in Chitungwiza in June 1999. 4,000 attended this gathering. The perceived success of this group was a critical part in the decision to form the Movement for Democratic Change.

At the convention's final meeting on 29 November, Justice Chidyausiku announced that the proposed constitution had been adopted "by acclamation" and did not call for a vote. There was some dissent within the room, with dissenters arguing that the proposed constitution did not represent the opinions of Zimbabweans on issues such as presidential powers. Opponents argued that the Executive Presidency should be replaced with a Prime Minister accountable to Parliament, and a titular and not executive President.

Constitutional proposals

The proposed constitution incorporated a "Bill of Rights" based on that adopted in South Africa but with some rights restricted (for example, it included no pledge to equal treatment for homosexuals). It proposed to expand the House of Assembly to 200 members, with 50 of them to be elected under a proportional voting system, and to create a new 60 member Senate. It proposed to limit the President to two successive five-year terms, a restriction to begin after the constitution came in force.

The executive President was to remain but be supplemented by a Prime Minister who would be head of government on a day-to-day basis. Opponents of the constitution criticised the legal immunities given to the State and to individuals holding office.

One of the more controversial aspects of the constitution covered land reform. The draft presented by the commission was not that presented to the electorate for the referendum, but a revised version redrafted by the Cabinet. The proposed Bill of Rights declared that "before Independence the people of Zimbabwe were unjustifiably dispossessed of their land and other resources without compensation", and therefore included a clause allowing the Government to take possession of white-owned land with compensation to be paid by the United Kingdom. Should the United Kingdom not pay, the constitution declared that the "Government of Zimbabwe has no obligation to pay compensation".

Administration

Referendums in Zimbabwe are counted by House of Assembly constituency. The Delimitation Commission determining the boundaries of constituencies had not yet reported in time for the 2000 elections and so the constituencies used were those drawn up by the 1994 Delimitation Commission. For details of their boundaries, see 1994 Delimitation Commission Report (Cmd. RZ 2 1995).

The voters' roll was reported to be in a poor state. A United Nations advisory team reported in December 1999 that up to a quarter of all the names were now dead, and a third of the names had since moved constituencies. The establishment of polling stations was delayed given the confusion, but the Registrar-General insisted on using the electoral roll rather than using other measures to prevent people from voting twice. A last-minute attempt to delay the referendum was turned down by the High Court.

Result

Constituency results

References

External links
Report of the Centre for Democracy and Development Observer Mission on the referendum (including results).
Presidential speech announcing Constitutional convention (Web.archive.org)
Draft constitution (Web.archive.org)

2000 referendums
2000 constitutional referendum
Constitutional referendum
2000 elections in Africa
Constitutional referendums in Zimbabwe